AKG may refer to:

alpha-Ketoglutaric acid, also known as 2-Ketoglutaric acid, 2-Oxopentanedioic acid, 2-Oxoglutamate, 2-Oxoglutaric acid & Oxoglutaric acid
Asian Kung-Fu Generation, a Japanese rock band
Alternatív Közgazdasági Gimnázium, a high school in Budapest, Hungary
A. K. Gopalan (1904–1977), Indian communist leader
A. K. G. (film), a 2007 Indian Malayalam documentary film
The ICAO Code for No. 84 Squadron RAF, United Kingdom
AKG (company), an acoustics engineering and manufacturing company